Frank Sedgman defeated Vic Seixas 6–4, 6–1, 6–1 in the final to win the men's singles tennis title at the 1951 U.S. National Championships.

Seeds
The tournament used two lists of eight players for seeding the men's singles event; one for U.S. players and one for foreign players. Frank Sedgman is the champion; others show the round in which they were eliminated.

U.S.
  Dick Savitt (semifinals)
  Arthur Larsen (semifinals)
  Tony Trabert (quarterfinals)
  Herbie Flam (quarterfinals)
  Bill Talbert (fourth round)
  Gardnar Mulloy (quarterfinals)
  Vic Seixas (finalist)
  J.E. Patty (quarterfinals)

Foreign
  Frank Sedgman (champion)
  Ken McGregor (fourth round)
  Mervyn Rose (fourth round)
  Tony Mottram (third round)
  Paul Remy (second round)
  Don Candy (third round)
  Jiro Kumamaru (first round)
  Sydney Levy (third round)

Draw

Key
 Q = Qualifier
 WC = Wild card
 LL = Lucky loser
 r = Retired

Final eight

Earlier rounds

Section 1

Section 2

Section 3

Section 4

Section 5

Section 6

Section 7

Section 8

References

External links
 1951 U.S. National Championships on ITFtennis.com, the source for this draw

Men's Singles
1951